World Mental Health Day (10 October) is an international day for global mental health education, awareness and advocacy against social stigma. It was first celebrated in 1992 at the initiative of the World Federation for Mental Health, a global mental health organization with members and contacts in more than 150 countries. This day, each October, thousands of supporters come to celebrate this annual awareness program to bring attention to mental illness and its major effects on people's lives worldwide. In addition, this day provides an opportunity for mental health professionals to discuss and shed light on their work, making mental health a priority worldwide. In some countries this day is part of an awareness week, such as Mental Health Week in Australia.

History 

World Mental Health Day was celebrated for the first time on October 10, 1992, at the initiative of Deputy Secretary General Richard Hunter. Up until 1994, the day had no specific theme other than general promoting mental health advocacy and educating the public.

In 1994 World Mental Health Day was celebrated with a theme for the first time at the suggestion of then Secretary General Eugene Brody. The theme was "Improving the Quality of Mental Health Services throughout the World".

World Mental Health Day is supported by WHO through raising awareness on mental health issues using its strong relationships with the Ministries of health and civil society organizations across the globe. WHO also supports with developing technical and communication material.

On World Mental Health Day 2018, Prime Minister Theresa May appointed Jackie Doyle-Price as the UK's first suicide prevention minister. This occurred while as the government hosted the first ever global mental health summit.

World Mental Health Day themes

See also

 Global Mental Health
 Mental Illness Awareness Week (US, first week of October)
 National Alliance on Mental Illness (NAMI)
 National Institute of Mental Health (NIMH)
 World Health Day
 World Federation for Mental Health

References

External links

World Federation for Mental Health
World Mental Health Day (WHO)
World Mental Health Day 2020
World Mental Health Day 2021 (WHO)
World Mental Health Day 2021 (PAHO)

Mental health
Mental health
Disability observances
October observances
1992 establishments